Solco Walle Tromp  (9, March 1909 - 17, March 1983) was a Dutch geologist and biometeorologist.

Tromp was from 1947 to 1950 Professor of geology at Cairo University. He co-founded the International Society of Biometeorology and published pioneering writings on biometeorology.

Tromp took a deep interest in dowsing and radiesthesia. He conducted experiments and came to the conclusion that dowsing is a real phenomenon due to activity of electromagnetic fields. His views on dowsing were criticized by the scientific community and have been described by critics as an example of pseudoscience.

Publications

The Religion of the Modern Scientist: Neo-Materialism (1947)
Psychical Physics: A Scientific Analysis of Dowsing Radiesthesia and Kindred Divining Phenomena (1949)
Medical Biometeorology: Weather, Climate, and the Living Organism (1963)
Pathological Biometeorology (1977)

References

1909 births
1983 deaths
Cairo University alumni
Dowsing
20th-century Dutch geologists